Latirus philberti, common name Philbert's Peristernia , is a species of sea snail, a marine gastropod mollusc in the family Fasciolariidae, the spindle snails, the tulip snails and their allies.

Description
The length of the shell attains 24 mm.

Distribution
This marine species occurs off the Philippines.

References

 Snyder M.A. & Lyons W.G. (2014). Rectifications regarding two fasciolariid names introduced by Récluz, 1844 and taxa to which those names have been related (Gastropoda: Fasciolariidae: Peristerniinae). Novapex. 15(3–4): 51–61

External links
 Reeve, L. A. (1847). Monograph of the genus Turbinella. In: Conchologia Iconica, or, illustrations of the shells of molluscous animals, vol. 4, pl. 1-13 and unpaginated text. L. Reeve & Co., London.

Fasciolariidae
Gastropods described in 1844